This is a list of airlines of Spain. The list includes only airlines having an Air Operator Certificate issued by the Civil Aviation Authority of Spain.

Scheduled airlines

Charter airlines

Cargo airlines

See also
 List of airlines
 List of airlines of Europe
 List of defunct airlines of Spain

References

Spain
Airlines
Airlines
Spain